Boris Babacar Diaw-Riffiod (born April 16, 1982), better known as Boris Diaw, is a French basketball executive and former player who is the president of Metropolitans 92 of LNB Pro A. Diaw began his playing career in Pro A and returned to that league after 14 seasons in the National Basketball Association (NBA). He played mostly at the power forward position. In 2006, Diaw was named the NBA's Most Improved Player as a member of the Phoenix Suns. He won an NBA championship with the San Antonio Spurs in 2014. 

Diaw was a member and captain of the senior French national team. He won a FIBA World Cup bronze medal in 2014, a EuroBasket title in 2013, a silver medal in EuroBasket 2011, and two bronze in EuroBasket 2005 and EuroBasket 2015. He earned an All-EuroBasket Team selection in 2005.

Since July 2019, Diaw has served as president of Metropolitans 92.

Professional basketball career

Pau-Orthez (2001–2003)
From 2001 to 2003, Diaw played for Pau-Orthez of the LNB Pro A, a French professional basketball league. In 2002, he competed in the league's All-Star game and the Slam Dunk contest.

Atlanta Hawks (2003–2005)
Diaw was selected by the Atlanta Hawks with the 21st overall pick in the 2003 NBA draft. On July 10, 2003, he signed a multi-year deal with the Hawks.

Phoenix Suns (2005–2008)
In August 2005, he was traded with two future first round picks to the Phoenix Suns in exchange for future teammate Joe Johnson.

In Phoenix, Diaw blossomed into an all-round player, playing any position from center to point guard and garnered the nickname "3D" because of his multidimensional play (his motto being "drive, dish, defend") and the combination of his number (3) and surname. Diaw averaged 13.3 points, 6.9 rebounds, 6.2 assists and 1.0 blocks per game on 52.6% field goal shooting and 73.1% from the free throw line in the 2005–06 season where he played both forward positions and then center after injuries to Amar'e Stoudemire and Kurt Thomas.

During the 2006 NBA playoffs, as the Suns' starting center, Diaw averaged 18.7 points, 6.7 rebounds, 5.2 assists and 1.1 blocks per game. In Game 1 of the 2006 Western Conference Finals against the Dallas Mavericks, Diaw scored a career-high 34 points, including the game-winner with 0.5 seconds remaining in regulation, to help the Suns to a 121–118 victory, although Phoenix would go on the lose the series in six games.

Charlotte Bobcats (2008–2012)

On December 10, 2008, Diaw, along with Raja Bell and Sean Singletary, was traded to the Charlotte Bobcats in exchange for Jason Richardson and Jared Dudley.

On September 28, 2011, Diaw signed with JSA Bordeaux of France for the duration the 2011 NBA lockout. In December 2011, he returned to the Charlotte Bobcats.

On March 21, 2012, Diaw was waived by the Bobcats.

San Antonio Spurs (2012–2016)
Two days later, he signed with the San Antonio Spurs for the rest of the season.

On July 12, 2012, Diaw re-signed with the Spurs to a reported two-year, $9.2 million deal. Diaw helped the Spurs reach the 2013 NBA Finals where they faced the Miami Heat. San Antonio lost the series in seven games.

On June 15, 2014, Diaw won his first NBA championship after the Spurs defeated the Miami Heat 4–1 in the 2014 NBA Finals. He was inserted into the starting lineup beginning with Game 3, and he led all players in the series in total assists (29) and was second in total rebounds (43) behind teammate Tim Duncan (50). Diaw averaged 35 minutes per game in the Finals, an increase of over 10 minutes from the regular season.

On July 15, 2014, Diaw re-signed with the Spurs to a reported three-year, $22 million contract.

On August 1, 2015, Diaw played for Team Africa at the 2015 NBA Africa exhibition game.

Utah Jazz (2016–2017)
On July 8, 2016, Diaw was traded, along with a 2022 second-round pick and cash considerations, to the Utah Jazz in exchange for the rights to Olivier Hanlan. In early November 2016, Diaw missed eight games with a right leg contusion. On July 13, 2017, he was waived by the Jazz.

Levallois Metropolitans (2017–2018)
On September 17, 2017, Diaw signed with the Levallois Metropolitans, a French team, for the 2017–18 season. With Levallois, he played in the LNB Pro A and EuroCup. He averaged 11.1 points, 6.4 rebounds in 31.2 minutes per game in 31 Pro A games.

Retirement
Diaw announced his retirement via his Twitter account on September 6, 2018.

NBA career statistics

Regular season

|-
| align="left" | 
| align="left" | Atlanta
| 76 || 37 || 25.3 || .447 || .231 || .602 || 4.5 || 2.4 || .8 || .5 || 4.5
|-
| align="left" | 
| align="left" | Atlanta
| 66 || 25 || 18.2 || .422 || .180 || .740 || 2.6 || 2.3 || .6 || .3 || 4.8
|-
| align="left" | 
| align="left" | Phoenix
| 81 || 70 || 35.5 || .526 || .267 || .731 || 6.9 || 6.2 || .7 || 1.0 || 13.3
|-
| align="left" | 
| align="left" | Phoenix
| 73 || 59 || 31.1 || .538 || .333 || .683 || 4.3 || 4.8 || .4 || .5 || 9.7
|-
| align="left" | 
| align="left" | Phoenix
| 82 || 19 || 28.1 || .477 || .317 || .744 || 4.6 || 3.9 || .7 || .5 || 8.8
|-
| align="left" | 
| align="left" | Phoenix
| 22 || 0 || 24.5 || .567 || .357 || .692 || 3.8 || 2.1 || .5 || .4 || 8.3
|-
| align="left" | 
| align="left" | Charlotte
| 59 || 59 || 37.6 || .495 || .419 || .686 || 5.9 || 4.9 || .8 || .7 || 15.1
|-
| align="left" | 
| align="left" | Charlotte
| 82 || 82 || 35.4 || .483 || .320 || .769 || 5.2 || 4.0 || .7 || .7 || 11.3
|-
| align="left" | 
| align="left" | Charlotte
| 82 || 82 || 33.9 || .492 || .345 || .683 || 5.0 || 4.1 || .9 || .6 || 11.3
|-
| align="left" | 
| align="left" | Charlotte
| 37 || 28 || 27.5 || .410 || .267 || .630 || 5.3 || 4.3 || .5 || .5 || 7.4
|-
| align="left" | 
| align="left" | San Antonio
| 20 || 7 || 20.3 || .588 || .615 || .625 || 4.3 || 2.4 || .7 || .3 || 4.7
|-
| align="left" | 
| align="left" | San Antonio
| 75 || 20 || 22.8 || .539 || .385 || .723 || 3.4 || 2.4 || .7 || .4 || 5.8
|-
| style="text-align:left;background:#afe6ba;"| †
| align="left" | San Antonio
| 79 || 24 || 25.0 || .521 || .402 || .739 || 4.1 || 2.8 || .6 || .4 || 9.1
|-
| style="text-align:left;" | 
| style="text-align:left;" | San Antonio
| 81 || 15 || 24.5 || .460 || .320 || .774 || 4.3 || 2.9 || .4 || .3 || 8.7
|-
| style="text-align:left;"| 
| style="text-align:left;"| San Antonio
| 76 || 4 || 18.2 || .527 || .362 || .737 || 3.1 || 2.3 || .3 || .3 || 6.4
|-
| style="text-align:left;"| 
| style="text-align:left;"| Utah
| 73 || 33 || 17.6 || .446 || .247 || .743 || 2.2 || 2.3 || .2 || .1 || 4.6
|- class="sortbottom"
| style="text-align:center;" colspan="2" | Career
| 1064 || 564 || 27.0 || .493 || .336 || .717 || 4.4 || 3.5 || .6 || .5 || 8.6

Playoffs

|-
| align="left" | 2006
| align="left" | Phoenix
| 20 || 20 || 39.8 || .526 || .429 || .761 || 6.7 || 5.2 || .9 || 1.1 || 18.7
|-
| align="left" | 2007
| align="left" | Phoenix
| 10 || 0 || 23.5 || .475 || .000 || .667 || 3.2 || 3.0 || .7 || .2 || 6.6
|-
| align="left" | 2008
| align="left" | Phoenix
| 5 || 2 || 35.6 || .547 || .000 || .500 || 5.6 || 4.6 || .6 || .8 || 14.6
|-
| align="left" | 2010
| align="left" | Charlotte
| 4 || 4 || 38.0 || .500 || .111 || .500 || 5.0 || 4.0 || .3 || .8 || 7.5
|-
| align="left" | 2012
| align="left" | San Antonio
| 14 || 14 || 24.7 || .514 || .500 || .750 || 5.2 || 2.5 || .8 || .3 || 6.2
|-
| align="left" | 2013
| align="left" | San Antonio
| 16 || 1 || 17.1 || .444 || .385 || .857 || 2.5 || 1.8 || .3 || .2 || 4.1
|-
| style="text-align:left;background:#afe6ba;"| 2014†
| align="left" | San Antonio
| 23 || 3 || 26.3 || .500 || .400 || .688 || 4.9 || 3.4 || .6 || .1 || 9.2
|-
| align="left" | 2015
| align="left" | San Antonio
| 7 || 0 || 28.3 || .479 || .222 || .692 || 6.1 || 3.6 || .7 || .4 || 11.6
|-
| align="left" | 2016
| align="left" | San Antonio
| 9 || 0 || 17.7 || .457 || .333 || .750 || 2.1 || 2.3 || .2 || .4 || 5.2
|-
| align="left" | 2017
| align="left" | Utah
| 11 || 9 || 18.4 || .500 || .429 || .900 || 1.9 || 2.0 || .6 || .4 || 5.7
|- class="sortbottom"
| style="text-align:center;" colspan="2" | Career
| 119 || 53 || 26.4 || .504 || .336 || .736 || 4.4 || 3.2 || .6 || .4 || 9.2

National team career

In 2000, Diaw won the FIBA Europe Under-18 Championship with the French junior national team. In July 2006, Diaw was named the captain of the senior men's French national basketball team. He won the bronze medal at the EuroBasket 2005.

Diaw led the French team at the 2006 FIBA World Championship, with 107 points and 22 assists, in 9 games. In 2013, Diaw and the French team won the gold medal at the EuroBasket tournament. The following year, he led the national team without its star Tony Parker to the bronze medal in the 2014 FIBA World Cup.

International statistics

Player profile
However, his passing skills and ability to score inside earned him a reputation for being capable of playing all positions well. Diaw began the 2005–06 season as a reserve, substituted at point guard when starting point guard Steve Nash was injured, started at small forward, and was finally moved to center when all three Suns centers were injured. Diaw's breakout season (13.3 points, 6.9 rebounds and 6.2 assists per game) was recognized with the Most Improved Player Award. Diaw was lauded for his unselfish but assertive play.,

While somewhat overshadowed by the Spurs 'Big Three' of Duncan, Parker and Ginobili, Diaw played a crucial role in the team's success. His excellent passing and playmaking abilities made him a prototype of what came to be known as the point forward position, exhibited by players such as Luka Doncic and to a lesser degree by LeBron James and Nikola Jokic. Diaw was also an efficient post scorer and athletic scorer, capable of going coast-to-coast before either finding a teammate or finishing at the rim. In addition, his ability to play multiple positions made him a precursor to the current era of small ball teams and positionless basketball.

Executive career
In 2009, Diaw became vice-president and shareholder of the JSA Bordeaux basketball club in his native France and took over as president one year later. In 2017, he stepped down as president of the club.

In 2010, he founded UKIND, an eco-responsible clothing brand.

On July 4, 2019, Diaw was announced as the new president of Metropolitans 92, succeeding Jean-Pierre Aubry.

Personal life
Diaw's  mother, Élisabeth Riffiod, is regarded as one of the best centers in French women's basketball history. She is a member of the French Basketball Hall of Fame. Diaw's father, Issa Diaw, is a former Senegalese high jump champion. Diaw has a half-brother, Paco Diaw, who was a guard at Georgia Tech, but transferred to Lee University, a small NAIA school in the Southern States Athletic Conference. His other brother, Martin Diaw, played basketball for Division II's California University of Pennsylvania.

Diaw and fellow French NBA star and Spurs teammate Tony Parker are long-time friends and former roommates. Diaw was the best man at Parker's wedding to actress Eva Longoria.

In 2005, Diaw established a non-profit foundation, Babac'Ards, to organize sports activities for Senegalese youth and aid "developmental education".

Diaw is known to have a passion for photography, sailing and wine tasting.

See also

 List of European basketball players in the United States

References

External links

 
 Boris Diaw at interbasket.net
 
 
 

1982 births
Living people
Sportspeople of Senegalese descent
Atlanta Hawks draft picks
Atlanta Hawks players
Basketball players at the 2012 Summer Olympics
Basketball players at the 2016 Summer Olympics
Black French sportspeople
Centers (basketball)
Centre Fédéral de Basket-ball players
Charlotte Bobcats players
Élan Béarnais players
FIBA EuroBasket-winning players
French expatriate basketball people in the United States
French men's basketball players
French sportspeople of Senegalese descent
JSA Bordeaux Basket players
National Basketball Association players from France
Olympic basketball players of France
Metropolitans 92 players
People from Cormeilles-en-Parisis
Phoenix Suns players
Power forwards (basketball)
San Antonio Spurs players
Utah Jazz players
2014 FIBA Basketball World Cup players
2010 FIBA World Championship players
2006 FIBA World Championship players
Sportspeople from Val-d'Oise